Cai Tianxiong (born 26 December 1954) is a Chinese water polo player. He competed in the men's tournament at the 1984 Summer Olympics.

References

1954 births
Living people
Chinese male water polo players
Olympic water polo players of China
Water polo players at the 1984 Summer Olympics
Asian Games medalists in water polo
Asian Games gold medalists for China
Water polo players at the 1978 Asian Games
Water polo players at the 1982 Asian Games
Water polo players at the 1986 Asian Games
Medalists at the 1978 Asian Games
Medalists at the 1982 Asian Games
Medalists at the 1986 Asian Games
Place of birth missing (living people)
20th-century Chinese people